Jørgen Iversen (1 May 1918 – 31 December 1993) was a Danish footballer. He played in five matches for the Denmark national football team from 1937 to 1940.

References

External links
 

1918 births
1993 deaths
Danish men's footballers
Denmark international footballers
Place of birth missing
Association footballers not categorized by position